Alberto Berasategui Salazar (born 28 June 1973) is a former top-10 professional tennis player from Spain. He was a Grand Slam finalist at the 1994 French Open, and won a total of 14 ATP singles titles, achieving a career-high singles ranking of world no. 7 in November 1994.

Tennis career
Berasategui won a total of 14 top-level singles titles and one tour doubles title. All of them, as well as all losses in finals, were on clay. He won at least one singles title for six consecutive years (1993–1998). He began playing tennis at age seven and was the European junior champion in 1991. He turned professional later that year, and won his first top-level singles title in 1993, two years later.

In 1994, Berasategui reached nine finals, winning seven of them. He also reached his first Grand Slam final at the French Open, where he defeated Wayne Ferreira, Cédric Pioline, Yevgeny Kafelnikov, Javier Frana, Goran Ivanišević and Magnus Larsson to face fellow Spaniard and defending champion Sergi Bruguera who defeated him in four sets.

Berasategui retired from the professional tour in May 2001, having had persistent wrist injuries since his match with Hernán Gumy at the Bologna tournament in June 1998. The injuries had an adverse effect on his results and form, and had caused his consistency and ranking to decline. He also suffered severe cramps of unknown origin in long matches.

Playing style
Berasategui was known for his extreme western grip, known as the "Hawaiian grip", where his unusual hold on the racket would allow him to hit both forehands and backhands with the same side of the racket. This helped him on clay, but he did not have much of an impact on other surfaces except for a quarterfinals appearance at the 1998 Australian Open, after having beaten world No. 2, Patrick Rafter in four sets in the third round, and came back from two sets down to beat the 1995, 2000, and 2001 Australian Open champion, former and future world No. 1, Andre Agassi, in the fourth round. He lost in quarterfinals to Marcelo Ríos after winning a tight first-set tiebreak.

Grand Slam finals

Singles: 1 (1 runner-up)

ATP career finals

Singles: 23 (14 titles, 9 runner-ups)

Doubles: 4 (1 title, 3 runner-ups)

ATP Challenger and ITF Futures finals

Singles: 10 (7–3)

Doubles: 1 (1–0)

Performance timeline

Singles

Doubles

References

External links
 
 
 

Spanish expatriate sportspeople in Andorra
Spanish male tennis players
1973 births
Living people
People from Arrigorriaga
Mediterranean Games medalists in tennis
Mediterranean Games silver medalists for Spain
Mediterranean Games bronze medalists for Spain
Competitors at the 1991 Mediterranean Games
Competitors at the 1993 Mediterranean Games
Sportspeople from Biscay
Tennis players from the Basque Country (autonomous community)